Wisma 46 is a 261.9-meter tall (architectural height) skyscraper located in the BNI City complex at Jalan Jenderal Sudirman in Jakarta, Indonesia. The 46-floor office tower features an  antenna spire, and was completed in 1996 under the design by Zeidler Roberts Partnership (Zeidler Partnership Architects) and DP Architects Private Ltd.

The tower is located on a 15 hectares lot in the city centre. It has a floor area of 140,028 m2. The tower has 46 floors above ground which consist of offices only. There are 2 underground floors used for car parking. The tower contains 23 elevators which can reach speeds of 360 mpm in the super high speed models.

Wisma 46 is the 358th tallest existing building in the world. When measured up to the roof, the tower is 261.9 m tall and when measured up to the lower roof, it is only 202.9 m tall.

Design

This building has a modern design and also a unique appearance, which is curved shaped like a pen and fully covered by square patterned glass facade. On either side of the tower, the glass facade is covered by a hollow concrete wall that is also square shaped. Because of its uniqueness, this skyscraper is one of the icons of Jakarta after Monas.

In popular culture
This building appears in the 2004 video game Need For Speed: Underground 2, located in Bayview City Centre.

This building also appears on the front cover of the book Indonesia Etc: Exploring the Improbable Nation by Elizabeth Pisani.

See also

List of skyscrapers
Bank Negara Indonesia
List of tallest buildings in Jakarta

References

External links
SkyscraperPage.com's entry
Emporis.com – Building ID 104696
Google 3D Warehouse – Wisma 46, Kota BNI, Jakarta

Bank Negara Indonesia
Towers in Indonesia
Buildings and structures in Jakarta
Skyscraper office buildings in Indonesia
Post-independence architecture of Indonesia
Office buildings completed in 1995